Polyphème is a 1922 French opera by Jean Cras based on a poem  by Albert Samain, on the classical story of Acis and Galatea.

Cast
 Polyphème (baritone)
 Galatée (soprano)
 Acis (tenor)
 Lycas soprano)
 A wood spirit (tenor)
 A nymph (soprano)

Recordings
 Choeur Régional Vittoria d'Ile-de-France, Orchestre Philharmonique du Luxembourg, direction Bramwell Tovey. Timpani - 3CDs recorded 2003.

References

1922 operas
French-language operas
Operas